Fisher Bay is a community in the Interlake Region of Manitoba.

Demographics 

Notable people
Janet Cochrane

References

Designated places in Manitoba
Northern communities in Manitoba